Sir Robert Groves Sandeman, KCSI (1835–1892) was a British Indian Army officer and colonial administrator. He was known for his activities in Balochistan, where he introduced a system of "tribal pacification" that endured until the partition of India in 1947.

Early life
Sandeman was born on 25 February 1835, the son of General Robert Turnbull Sandeman. He was educated at Perth and University of St Andrews, and joined the 33rd Bengal Infantry in 1856. When that regiment was disarmed at Phillour by General John Nicholson during the Indian Rebellion of 1857, he took part in the final capture of Lucknow as adjutant of the 11th Bengal Lancers. After the suppression of the Mutiny he was appointed to the Punjab Commission by Sir John Lawrence.

Career
In 1866 he was appointed district officer of Dera Ghazi Khan, and there first showed his capacity in dealing with the Baluch tribes. He was the first to break through the close-border system of Lord Lawrence by extending British influence to the independent tribes beyond the border. In his hands this policy worked admirably, owing to his tact in managing the tribesmen and his genius for control.

In February 1871, he was given political control over the warring Marri, Bugti and Mazari tribes of the Sulaiman Hills at the Mithankot conference between the then governments of Punjab and Sindh provinces.

Sandemanization

In 1876, with the help of Nawab Sir Imam Baksh Khan Mazari of Rojhan, he negotiated the Treaty of Kalat with the Khan of Kalat, which subsequently governed relations between Kalat and the government. He became agent to the governor-general of Balochistan in 1877, an office which he held until his death.

Sandeman introduced an innovative system of tribal pacification in Balochistan, informally termed 'Sandemanization', that was in effect from 1877 to 1947. He gave financial allowances to tribal chiefs who enforced control, and used British military force only when necessary. However, the Government of India generally opposed his Forward Policy methods and refused to allow it to operate in India's North West Frontier. Historians have long debated its scope and effectiveness in his mostly peaceful spread of Imperial influence.

Second Afghan War and aftermath
During the Second Anglo-Afghan War in 1878 his influence over the tribesmen was of the utmost importance, since it enabled him to keep intact the line of communications with Kandahar, and to control the tribes after the British disaster at Maiwand. For these services he was made K.C.S.I. in 1879. In 1889 he occupied the Zhob valley, a strategic advantage which opened the Gomal Pass through the Waziri country to caravan traffic. Sandeman's system was not so well suited to the Pashtun as to his Baluch neighbours. But in Balochistan he was a pioneer, a pacificator and a successful administrator, who converted the region from a state of complete anarchy into a province as orderly as any in British India.

Legacy and evaluation
Sandeman died at Bela, the capital of Las Bela state, on 29 January 1892. His nephew by his sister Julia was Walter Massy-Greene, who became a cabinet minister in Australia.

Recent scholarship in postcolonial studies and on colonial Balochistan has disputed this overtly laudatory account of Sandeman's life and career as explicated in books such as Tucker's "Sir Robert G. Sandeman: Peaceful Conqueror of Balochistan" and Bruce's "The Forward Policy and its Results". At a conceptual level, the idea of colonial rulers bringing order to the colonized territory has been questioned by authors such as Edward Said and Nicholas Dirks who argue that this myth resulted from a misunderstanding of (mostly unwritten) local social and cultural norms. It was the product of an effort to make alien peoples and territories governable through the invention of categories of savage and civilized. In respect of colonial Balochistan, Simanti Dutta points out that Sandeman skillfully exploited an existing rift between the Baloch ruler, the Khan of Kalat, and his subordinate tribal chiefs to leverage his influence and project British power into a region which was strategically significant in the context of Anglo-Russian rivalry in Afghanistan. A careful examination of historical records suggests that there were a number of armed uprisings against British rule in Balochistan during and after Sandeman's tenure which had to be put down through the use of lethal force and imposition of crippling financial penalties on the defaulting tribes.

Notes

References
 Tripodi, Christian. "'Good for one but not the other': The 'Sandeman System' of Pacification as Applied to Baluchistan and the North-West Frontier, 1877–1947." Journal of Military History 73#3 (2009): 767–802. online
Tucker AP (1921) Sir Robert G. Sandeman, K.C.S.I., peaceful conqueror of Baluchistan.
Thornton, Thomas Henry (1895) Colonel Sir Robert Sandeman: His Life and Work on Our Indian Frontier
Bruce, Richard Isaac (1900) The Forward Policy and its Results
Said, Edward (1978) Orientalism.
Said, Edward (1993) Culture and Imperialism.
Dirks, Nicholas (1992) Colonialism and Culture.
Dutta, Simanti (2002) Imperial Mappings in Savage Spaces: Baluchistan and British India. 

1835 births
1892 deaths
Alumni of the University of St Andrews
British East India Company Army officers
British military personnel of the Indian Rebellion of 1857
British people of the Second Anglo-Afghan War
Knights Commander of the Order of the Star of India
Military personnel from Perth, Scotland